Vera Sergeyevna Bulich (1898–1954) was a Russian poet, prose writer and critic. Georgii Adamovich compared the fine delicacy of her poetry to the finish of Chinese porcelain.

Life
The daughter of Sergei Bulich, a St Petersburg University professor specializing in Russian linguistics and music history, Vera Bulich was born in Saint Petersburg on 17 February 1898. The family fled Saint Petersburg after the Russian Revolution and settled in Finland. There she worked in the Slavic Department of the University of Helsinki library. In 1947 was appointed head of the newly founded Institute for Soviet Studies, establishing a library of over 20,000 volumes. She died of lung cancer in Helsinki on 2 July 1954.

From 1920 Bulich published Russian poetry, reviews and translations in emigre journals. Her first book (1927) was a collection of fairy tales for children in Finnish; subsequent books – another collection of fairy tales, and four books of poetry – were written in Russian.

Works
 Satu pikkiriikkisesta prinsessasta, 1927
 Skazki [Fairy tales], 2 vols., 1931
 Maiatnik. Pervaia kniga stikhov [Pendulum: A First Collection of Poems], 1934
 Plennyi veter. Vtoraia kniga stikhov [Captive Wind: A Second Collection of Poems], 1938
 Burelom. Tret`ia kniga stikhov [Storm-Felled Wood: A Third Collection of Poems], 1947
 Vetvi. Chetvërtaia kniga stikhov [Branches: A Fourth Collection of Poems], 1954

References

1898 births
1954 deaths
Russian women writers
Russian poets
Finnish librarians
Women librarians
Finnish writers
Russian emigrants to Finland